Gmina Górzno may refer to either of the following administrative districts in Poland:
Gmina Górzno, Kuyavian-Pomeranian Voivodeship
Gmina Górzno, Masovian Voivodeship